Alexei Alexandrovich Sitnikov (born 23 May 1986) is a former competitive ice dancer. Competing for Azerbaijan with Julia Zlobina, he is the 2013 Golden Spin of Zagreb champion, 2013 Volvo Open Cup champion, 2012 Nebelhorn Trophy silver medalist, and 2013 Winter Universiade silver medalist. They competed at the 2014 Winter Olympics, finishing 12th, and have placed as high as sixth at the European Championships (2014).

Career

Career for Russia 
Zlobina and Sitnikov teamed up in June 2001. Early in their career, they represented Russia and were coached by Igor Gavrin and later Olga Riabinina. In 2005, they moved with Riabinina from Kirov to Rostov-on-Don. In 2006, Zlobina/Sitnikov won the bronze medal in Hungary and gold in the Czech Republic on the Junior Grand Prix circuit. Their final international event representing Russia was the 2008 Nebelhorn Trophy, where they finished 5th. In May 2009, they moved with Riabinina to Moscow and joined Elena Kustarova and Svetlana Alexeeva's group. In the 2009–10 season, Zlobina/Sitnikov made no international appearances but competed at the Russian Championships, where they finished 5th.

Career for Azerbaijan 
Zlobina/Sitnikov decided to represent Azerbaijan and made their first appearance for the country at the 2011 Estonian Championships, competing as guests. In mid-2011, they switched to another Moscow-based coaching team, Alexander Zhulin and Oleg Volkov, with Zhulin also serving as their choreographer. In the 2011–12 season, Zlobina/Sitnikov won the bronze medal at the 2011 Ondrej Nepela Memorial and gold at the Istanbul Cup. Their first major international event was the 2012 European Championships, where they finished 10th. They then placed 17th at the 2012 World Championships.

Zlobina/Sitnikov began the 2012–13 season by taking gold at Ice Star in Belarus and then silver at the 2012 Nebelhorn Trophy. They finished sixth at their first Grand Prix event since 2007, the 2012 Skate Canada, and fifth at the 2012 Trophee Eric Bompard. After placing seventh at the 2013 European Championships, the team finished 16th at the 2013 World Championships and qualified a spot for Azerbaijan in the ice dancing event at the 2014 Winter Olympics.

Zlobina/Sitnikov changed coaches before the 2013–14 season, joining Igor Shpilband and Alexei Gorshkov in Novi, Michigan. They had a weak start to their season, placing eighth at the 2013 Skate America but went on win gold at the 2013 Golden Spin of Zagreb, Volvo Open Cup, and Ukrainian Open, and silver at the 2013 Winter Universiade. They placed sixth at the 2014 European Championships, a career high.

Programs 
(with Zlobina)

Results

With Zlobina for Azerbaijan

With Zlobina for Russia

References

External links 

 
 Julia Zlobina / Alexei Sitnikov at Sport-folio

Living people
1986 births
Sportspeople from Kirov, Kirov Oblast
Russian male ice dancers
Azerbaijani male ice dancers
Russian emigrants to Azerbaijan
Figure skaters at the 2014 Winter Olympics
Olympic figure skaters of Azerbaijan
Universiade medalists in figure skating
Universiade silver medalists for Azerbaijan
Competitors at the 2013 Winter Universiade